Dauvit Broun, FRSE, FBA (born 1961) is a Scottish historian and academic. He is the professor of Scottish history at the University of Glasgow. A specialist in medieval Scottish and Celtic studies, he concentrates primarily on early medieval Scotland, and has written abundantly on the topic of early Scottish king-lists, as well as on literacy, charter-writing, national identity, and on the text known as de Situ Albanie. He is editor of the New Edinburgh History of Scotland series, the pre-1603 editor of the Scottish Historical Review, convener of the Scottish History Society, and the Principal Investigator of the Arts and Humanities Research Council-funded project 'The Paradox of Medieval Scotland, 1093–1286'.

Honours
Dauvit was elected a Fellow of the Royal Society of Edinburgh in 2013. In July 2017, Broun was elected a Fellow of the British Academy (FBA), the United Kingdom's national academy for the humanities and social sciences. In 2013 he delivered the British Academy's Sir John Rhys Memorial Lecture.

References

External links
 Staff Profile at the University of Glasgow
 POMS website
 

1961 births
Living people
Celtic studies scholars
British medievalists
20th-century Scottish historians
Academics of the University of Glasgow
Fellows of the British Academy
21st-century Scottish historians